Home Creek is a former rural locality in the Barcaldine Region, Queensland, Australia.

On 22 November 2019 the Queensland Government decided to amalgamate the localities in the Barcaldine Region, resulting in five expanded localities based on the larger towns: Alpha, Aramac, Barcaldine, Jericho and Muttaburra. Home Creek was incorporated into Barcaldine.

Geography 
The Landsborough Highway passes through the locality from north (Patrick) to south (Blackall).

The watercourse Home Creek (from which the locality presumably takes its name) rises in Evora to the south-east and then flows through the locality of Home Creek from the south-east to the west (Barcaldine Downs) where it becomes a tributary to the Alice River.

The principal land use is grazing on native vegetation.

Education 
There are no schools in Home Creek. The nearest primary and secondary schools are in Barcaldine and Blackall.

References 

Barcaldine Region
Unbounded localities in Queensland